Sorby is an English family name and may refer to the following people:

 Angela Sorby, American poet, professor and literary scholar
 Henry Clifton Sorby (1826–1908), English microscopist and geologist
 Sunniva Sorby, Norwegian-Canadian expeditioner, historian and guide
 Thomas Sorby (1856–1930), English international footballer
 Warren Sorby (born 1965), Fijian Olympic swimmer

See also
 Sorby Research Institute, a Second World War medical research facility in Sheffield, England